Bangamata Sheikh Fojilatunnesa Mujib Science & Technology University is a government financed public university of Bangladesh. It is the 40th public university of Bangladesh and the first science and technology university in Mymensingh division.

History 
Former State Minister of Textile and Jute Ministry, Mr. Mirza Azam M.P. applied to Honorable Prime Minister Sheikh Hasina to establish a public university named Bangamata Sheikh Fojilatunnesa Mujib Science & Technology University at Melandaha upazila in Jamalpur district. On 30 January 2017 Bangladesh government agreed in principle to the Acts for the Bangamata Sheikh Fojilatunnesa Mujib Science & Technology University in Melandaha Upazila of Jamalpur District."Bangamata Sheikh Fojilatunnesa Mujib Science & Technology University Bill-2017" was passed unanimously in the National Parliament on 20 November 2017. Then this university was gazetted on 28 November 2017.

On 19 November 2018, President M Abdul Hamid as well as chancellor of the university appointed imminent educationist Syed Samsuddin Ahmed as the first vice chancellor of BSFMSTU. Initially, 133 students took admission, enrolling in four subjects under four faculties of the university. The departments are as follows: Mathematics, under the Faculty of Science, Management, under the faculty of Business Administration, Social Work, under the Faculty of Social Science and Computer Science and Engineering, under the Faculty of Engineering. Academic session of 1st batch began in March 2019.In the second academic year, the university has opened Electrical and Electronic Engineering and after that the university has been shifted to permanent campus which was previously known as 'Sheikh Fojilatunnesa Mujib Fisheries College' and fisheries department is now under the faculty of science of the university .Further development project is going on currently and the feasibility study has been completed for the establishment project of the university which will cost more than 4000 crore BDT.

Academics

Faculties and Departments
The university's 6 departments are organised into 4 faculties.

Laboratory facilities

Computer Science and Engineering (CSE) department has six modern laboratories.

 Programming Lab
 Software Engineering Lab
 Networking Lab
 Circuit Analysis Lab 
 Analog and Digital Electronics Lab 
 Communication Lab

Electrical and Electronic Engineering (EEE) department has six modern laboratories.

 Electrical & Measurements and Instrumental Lab
 Analog and Digital Electronics Lab
 Programming & Simulation Lab
 Electrical Machine Lab I (On Tender)
 Electrical Machine Lab II (On Tender)
 Analog & Digital Communication Lab

Fisheries department has five laboratories including very expensive 'Genetic Analyzer Machine Lab'.

 Fisheries Management Lab
 Fisheries Lab I
 Fisheries Lab II
 Genetic Analyzer Machine Lab (On Tender)
 Fisheries Lab III
Bio-diversity Lab 

Other departments also use Computer Lab, English Lab, Physics Lab for basic computer learning, scientific experiments and communication development.

Accommodation
For male:

Mirza Azam Hall (150 Seats)

For female:

Nurunnahar Begum Hall(148 Seats)

Transportation
2 Bus for students

3 Micro-bus for teachers and staffs

Other facilities
Central Library

Central Cafeteria

Medical Centre

Bank (Janata Bank)

Central Field

Organizations and clubs

Bangamata Debating Society

BSFMSTU Robotics Club

BSFMSTU Computer Club

BSFMSTU Photographic Society

Other activities and features
The university has opened IQAC (Internal Quality Assurance Cell). Outcome-based education (OBE) is also ensured here in this university with the help of renowned professors from top-ranked public universities in Bangladesh. Seminars, cultural programs, sports, journals, magazine publication and departmental tours are some of the regular co-curricular activities here.

Administration

Vice Chancellor

List of vice-chancellors 
 Syed Samsuddin Ahmed (19 November 2018 – 18 November 2022)
 Md.Kamrul Alam Khan (12 December 2022 - present)

References

External links
 University Grants Commission of Bangladesh
 Bangladesh Bureau of Educational Information and Statistics
 Bangamata Sheikh Fojilatunnesa Mujib Science & Technology University Bill-2017

Public engineering universities of Bangladesh
2018 establishments in Bangladesh
Universities established in the 2010s